Autobiography is a 2022 internationally co-produced thriller drama film, written and directed by  in his directorial debut. The film stars Kevin Ardilova and Arswendy Bening Swara. The film had its world premiere at the 79th Venice International Film Festival during the Horizons program on 2 September 2022, where it won the FIPRESCI Award for Best Film in sections other than the main competition.

Premise
The film follows Rakib (Kevin Ardilova) who serves as a housekeeper and assistant to a retired general, Purnawinata (Arswendy Bening Swara) who runs an election campaign to be a regent.

Cast

Production
Mubarak proposed the first draft of the script of Autobiography to Bhara in 2017. The project was selected as a part of 2017 TorinoFilmLab and 2018 Ties That Bind.

The principal photography took place in Bojonegoro, East Java, Indonesia.

Release
Alpha Violet acquired worldwide sales rights to the film in July 2022. 

Autobiography had its world premiere during the Horizons program at the 79th Venice International Film Festival on 2 September 2022. Its North American premiere was at the Contemporary World Cinema at the 2022 Toronto International Film Festival in September 2022,  and it had its Asian premiere during the A Window on Asian Cinema at the 27th Busan International Film Festival in on 7 October.

Autobiography was also screened at the Adelaide Film Festival, on 22 October 2022. It was theatrical released in Indonesia on 19 January 2023.

Reception
On the review aggregator Rotten Tomatoes website, the film has an approval rating of 89% based on 9 reviews, with an average rating of 7.9/10.

Accolades

References

External links
 
 

2022 directorial debut films
2022 drama films
2022 films
2022 thriller films
Indonesian-language films